The Nigerian Youth Parliament (NYP), founded in 2008 under the administration of Umaru Musa Yar’adua GCFR is the body that oversees the activities of youths in Nigeria. By composition, it is a replica of the Red Chamber of the National Assembly, and as such, the Parliament is made up of 109 individuals representing all senatorial districts in Nigeria.

The Nigerian Youth Parliament (NYP) is a legislative and developmental training institution created to strengthen, reinforce, and consolidate efforts in empowering young people through meaningful youth representation in driving Nigeria’s developmental agenda.

The Nigerian Youth Parliament, which is under the tutelage of the National Assembly and funded by the Nigeria Federal Ministry of Youths and Sports Development, is a non partisan umbrella body for Nigerian youths created in compliance with the United Nations Charter on Youths Development and pursuant to the resolutions of the Commonwealth Heads of Government meeting in the Republic of Malta in 2005 as a platform through which their voices could be heard on government policies that directly affect them.

References

External links
 

Government agencies of Nigeria